Paraments or parements (from Late Latin paramentum, adornment, parare, to prepare, equip) are both the hangings or ornaments of a room of state, and the ecclesiastical vestments. Paraments include the liturgical hangings on and around the altar, such as altar cloths, as well as the cloths hanging from the pulpit and lectern, and in the ecclesiastical vestments category they include humeral veils and mitres.

In most Christian churches using paraments (including Roman Catholic and a wide variety of Protestant denominations), the liturgical paraments change in color depending on the season of the church year.
Advent - purple (or in some traditions, blue)
Christmas - white
Lent - purple
Easter - white
Pentecost, Good Friday and the feasts of martyrs - red
Ordinary time - green
All Souls' Day, Requiem Masses - black (optionally purple)

See also

Antependium
Antimension
Altar candle
Chancel flowers

Sources

Christian religious objects